Sabrina Calvo (born 19 September 1974) is a French author, illustrator and games writer.

Calvo identifies as a transgender person, with her work published as "David Calvo" before 2018.

Awards 
 2002: Prix Julia-Verlanger for Wonderful
 2016: Prix Bob Morane for Sous la Colline
 2018: Grand prix de l'Imaginaire for Toxoplasma
 2018: Prix Rosny aîné for Toxoplasma

Publications 
 Délius, une chanson d'été (1997, Mnémos)
 La Nuit des labyrinthes (2003, J'ai lu)
 
 Atomic Bomb, avec Fabrice Colin (2002, Ed. du Bélial)
 Sunk, avec Fabrice Colin (2005, Les Moutons électriques), ill. Arnaud Cremet.
 Minuscules flocons de neige depuis dix minutes (2006, Les Moutons électriques)
 Elliot du Néant (2012, La Volte)
 Sous la Colline (2015, La Volte)

Games 
 Oniri Island, 2018
 The Inner Friend, 2018

References

French science fiction writers
Transgender writers
French LGBT writers
French transgender people
1974 births
Living people